This discography of American alternative rock band Gin Blossoms, consists of six studio albums, one live album, two EPs, four compilation albums, and 15 singles.

Studio albums

Live albums

Compilations

EPs

Singles

Soundtracks
 Wayne's World 2 Track: "Idiot Summer" (1993)
 Kiss My Ass: Classic Kiss Regrooved Track: "Christine Sixteen" (1994)
 Speed Track: "Soul Deep" (1994)
 Empire Records Track: "'Til I Hear It from You" (1995)
 To the Extreme: America's Fast Track to Rock Track: "My Car" (1998)
 How to Lose a Guy in 10 Days Track: "Follow You Down" (2003)
 Big Star, Small World Track: "Back of a Car" (2006)
 Wonder Park Track: "Mega Pawn King" (2019)

DVDs
 Just South of Nowhere (2003)
 20th Century Masters – The Best of Gin Blossoms (2004)

Notes

References

Discography
Discographies of American artists
Alternative rock discographies